Admiral Harry Powlett, 6th Duke of Bolton PC (6 November 1720  – 25 December 1794) was a British nobleman and naval officer.

Origins
He was the second son of Harry Powlett, 4th Duke of Bolton by his wife Catherine Parry.

Career
He was educated at Winchester College (1728–1729). He joined the Royal Navy, and on 4 March 1740 was promoted lieutenant aboard . While commanding Oxford, in 1744 he took part in the Battle of Toulon, and later gave damaging evidence against Richard Lestock.

Before finding the fleet under Admiral William Martin on 22 May, he was able to capture the French frigate Embuscade. He was employed by Boscawen at the Siege of Pondicherry in 1748 to take soundings off Pondicherry, in order to arrange the dispositions of the naval blockade of the town.

Upon returning to England in April 1750, Captain Powlett charged Rear-Admiral Griffin with misconduct for failing to engage eight French ships at Cuddalore, a decision which had been generally unpopular among Griffin's captains. Griffin was found guilty of negligence and was temporarily suspended from his rank. Griffin in response court-martialed Powlett on charges including cowardice, which Powlett attempted to escape by going on half-pay. Meanwhile, he entered the House of Commons in 1751 as Member of Parliament for Christchurch.

Despite Powlett's evasions, he was court-martialled on 1 September 1752, but was acquitted due to Griffin's charges having failed for lack of evidence. The incident was sensational, and concluded in 1756 with a duel between the two officers on Blackheath. He was appointed to command  in January 1753.

Powlett's rapid rise to a captaincy and his willingness to commence court martial proceedings against his superiors were a result of his family connections. His father's support of Walpole had made him a Lord of the Admiralty in 1733, a post which he retained until 1742. Even after leaving the Admiralty, the Bolton political connections remained sufficiently strong to ensure his continued promotion. However, he had apparently already become a figure of satire and is believed to have inspired the character of "Captain Whiffle" in Smollett's 1748 novel The Adventures of Roderick Random.

In 1754, following his father's succession to the Dukedom, he became known as Lord Harry Powlett, and replaced his elder brother Charles Powlett as MP for the family's pocket borough of Lymington. He was appointed to command  on 4 February 1755 and petitioned the Duke of Newcastle, then prime minister, for promotion to flag rank, on the strength of his family's support of the government. However, a damaging accident to his reputation occurred soon after, while acting with Admiral Hawke's fleet off France. Sent on 22 August 1755 to chase a ship to the south-east, he became detached from the fleet. While waiting at the rendezvous on 25 August, the ship's carpenter reported Barfleur's sternpost to be dangerously loose, and Powlett returned to Spithead for repairs. In October 1755 he was court-martialled for having separated from the fleet and returned to port without justification. He was admonished on the first charge and acquitted on the second, and the carpenter was dismissed as incompetent. It was, however, widely believed that the carpenter had served as a scapegoat, and Powlett thereafter was given the sobriquet of "Captain Stern-Post".

Notwithstanding this incident, the Bolton influence proved irresistible, and he was promoted rear admiral on 4 June 1756 and vice admiral of the White on 14 February 1758. Feeling ran strongly against him, despite his promotions, and he never again received a naval command, even at the outbreak of the Seven Years' War in 1754. In 1756 supposedly Boscawen requested Powlett's appointment as his second-in-command but was refused by King George II, who shared in the general low opinion of Powlett. In 1761 he again changed constituencies, and was returned as MP for Winchester.

Succeeds to dukedom
As a lukewarm supporter of the government, he was intermittently at odds with George Grenville. However, upon succeeding to the dukedom in July 1765 by his brother's suicide, he threw off his political connections and became a supporter of the crown alone. Bolton was sworn of the Privy Council on 10 December 1766. In 1767 he was given the sinecure post of Vice-Admiral of Dorset and Vice-Admiral of Hampshire (held by several Dukes of Bolton), and promoted to Admiral of the Blue on 18 October 1770 and Admiral of the White on 31 March 1775.

In 1778 he went into opposition to the government over its handling of the American War of Independence, and joined Vice-Admiral Bristol in opposing the court-martial of Admiral Keppel. His political activity diminished after 1780, although in 1782 he was appointed Governor of the Isle of Wight and Lord Lieutenant of Hampshire.

Marriages and progeny
He married twice:
Firstly on 7 May 1752 to Mary Nunn (died 1764), by whom he had one daughter:
Lady Maria Henrietta Powlett (died 30 March 1779), wife of John Montagu, 5th Earl of Sandwich
Secondly on 8 April 1765, he married Katherine Lowther (died 21 March 1809), daughter of Robert Lowther, and sister of James Lowther, 1st Earl of Lonsdale, by whom he had two daughters:
Lady Amelia Powlett, died unmarried
Lady Catharine Margaret Powlett (1766 – 17 June 1807), wife of William Vane, 1st Duke of Cleveland

Death and succession

He died on 25 December 1794 at Hackwood Park, Winslade, in Hampshire, and was buried in Basing, Hampshire with a monument sculpted by John Flaxman RA.

Afterwards, due to his lack of male progeny his dukedom became extinct. His distant cousin and heir male George Paulet succeeded to the Marquessate of Winchester and other titles, while his estates of Bolton Hall, Bolton Castle, Hackwood Park and several others devolved upon his brother's natural daughter Jean Browne-Powlett, wife of Thomas Orde (later Thomas Orde-Powlett, 1st Baron Bolton), who adopted the additional surname of Powlett.

References

|-

|-

|-

|-

1720 births
1794 deaths
British MPs 1747–1754
British MPs 1754–1761
British MPs 1761–1768
Lord-Lieutenants of Hampshire
Powlett, Harry
Members of the Privy Council of Great Britain
People educated at Winchester College
Royal Navy admirals
Royal Navy personnel of the War of the Austrian Succession
British duellists
Harry
16
People from Richmondshire (district)
People from Winslade